The 2017 Challenger ATP Cachantún Cup was a professional tennis tournament played on red clay courts. It was the 10th edition of the tournament which will be part of the 2017 ATP Challenger Tour. It took place in Santiago, Chile between 6 and 11 March 2017.

Singles main-draw entrants

Seeds

 1 Rankings are as of February 27, 2017.

Other entrants
The following players received wildcards into the singles main draw:
  Marcelo Tomás Barrios Vera
  Nicolás Jarry
  Hans Podlipnik Castillo
  Matías Soto

The following player received entry using a protected ranking:
  Simone Bolelli

The following players received entry from the qualifying draw:
  Guilherme Clezar
  Hugo Dellien
  Christian Lindell
  Juan Pablo Varillas

Champions

Singles

 Rogério Dutra Silva def.  Nicolás Jarry 7–5, 6–3.

Doubles

 Marcelo Tomás Barrios Vera /  Nicolás Jarry def.  Máximo González /  Andrés Molteni 6–4, 6–3.

External links
Official Website

Challenger ATP Cachantún Cup
Cachantún Cup (ATP)
Cach